The Nieuw Israelietisch Weekblad (Dutch: New Israelite Weekly), in short NIW, is the only Jewish weekly and the oldest functioning news magazine in the Netherlands. Founded on August 4, 1865, it has since informed the Jewish community on issues concerning Jews and Judaism in the Netherlands and in the world. Its headquarters is in Amstelveen. The chairman of the NIW is Jigal Markuszower and the managing editor is Esther Voet.

The NIW has some 6,000 subscribers. To enlarge the readership, the NIW started a modernization campaign in 2001, but this had minimal effect on the number of subscribers. The total circulation of the magazine as of 2019 is more than 15.000 copies.

Chief editors

References 

Jews and Judaism in the Netherlands
Jewish magazines
Magazines established in 1865
Dutch-language magazines
News magazines published in Europe
Weekly magazines published in the Netherlands
Magazines published in Amsterdam